is a railway station on the Rikuu East Line in the city of Ōsaki, Miyagi Prefecture, Japan, operated by East Japan Railway Company (JR East).

Lines
Kawatabi-Onsen Station is served by the Rikuu East Line, and is located 38.8 rail kilometers from the terminus of the line at Kogota Station.

Station layout
Kawatabi-Onsen Station has one island platform, connected to the station building by a level crossing.

Platforms

History
The station was absorbed into the JR East network upon the privatization of JNR on April 1, 1987. The station was renamed to its present name on 22 March 1997.

Surrounding area
 Japan National Route 47
 Kawatabi Onsen
 Kawatabi Post Office

See also
 List of Railway Stations in Japan

External links

   

Railway stations in Miyagi Prefecture
Rikuu East Line
Railway stations in Japan opened in 1914
Ōsaki, Miyagi
Stations of East Japan Railway Company